Jungle is a ballet composed by the Dutch composer Henk Badings in 1959. It was choreographed by Rudi van Dantzig for the Dutch National Ballet, with sets and costumes by Toer van Schayk, and premiered on 20 December 1961 in Amsterdam.

References

Sources
 Leo Samama, Hylke van Lingen, 2006: Nederlandse muziek in de 20-ste eeuw, p.164. AUP Salomé: Amsterdam 
 Rudi van Dantzig, 2013: Herinneringen aan Sonia Gasjkell. De Arbeiderspers

External links
 TheaterEncyclopedie.nl: Jungle - Het Nationale Ballet - 1961-12-20

1961 ballet premieres
Ballets by Rudi van Dantzig
Ballets by Henk Badings